Jean Sauvagnargues (2 April 1915 – 6 August 2002) was a French politician who served as Minister of Foreign Affairs under Valéry Giscard d'Estaing from 1974 to 1976 and was Ambassador to Ethiopia, Tunisia, West Germany, and the United Kingdom. Sauvagnargues died on 6 August 2002 in Lausanne, aged 87.

Honours
  Commandeur de la Légion d’Honneur, 
  Commandeur de l’ordre national du Mérite, 
  Croix de guerre.

See also
 List of Ambassadors of France to the United Kingdom

References

1915 births
2002 deaths
Politicians from Paris
French Foreign Ministers
École Normale Supérieure alumni
Ambassadors of France to West Germany
Ambassadors of France to the United Kingdom
Ambassadors of France to Ethiopia
Ambassadors of France to Tunisia
20th-century French diplomats